The Women's pole vault at the 2014 Commonwealth Games, as part of the athletics programme, was held at Hampden Park on 2 August 2014.

Records

Final

References

Women's pole vault
2014
2014 in women's athletics